Frank Adams (12 June 1935 – 11 August 2019), known as Bluey Adams, was an Australian rules football player, who played in the Victorian Football League (VFL) for the Melbourne Football Club.

Football
His prime positions were in the forward pocket, where he was a regular, damaging goal-kicker, and as a rover and a wing-man, where he was able to use his great pace to advantage in the open spaces of the MCG.  He was one of the fortunate few Melbourne players to be part of all six premierships the club gained during its ten 'golden years' from 1955 to 1964.

Athletics
Adams was a national champion professional sprinter. Adams won the 1957, 75 yards/130 yards Gift double at Cobram then a week later won the Lilydale Gift (130 yds) before running second in the 1957 Bendigo Thousand (130 yds). 

After running second in the Maryborough Gift, Adams won the 1958 Ararat Gift off a handicap of 3 yards in 12.3 seconds. He rounded off the year winning the South Melbourne and 1958 Canberra Gifts.

In November 1958, Adams ran a superb time of 43.8 seconds for 400 yards on a wet grass track at South Melbourne,

Adams won the 1959 Australian sprint title before losing the title in 1960 to Terry Clarke, before retiring from athletics at the age of 25.

Death
Adams died age 84 on 11 August 2019 from cancer.

Notes

References
 Mason, Percy (1985). Professional Athletics in Australia. Adelaide: Rigby Publishers, p 113.

External links

DemonWiki profile

Melbourne Football Club players
1935 births
2019 deaths
Australian male sprinters
Australian rules footballers from Victoria (Australia)
Deaths from cancer in Australia
Six-time VFL/AFL Premiership players
Melbourne Football Club Premiership players